Gone Again is the sixth studio album by Patti Smith, released June 18, 1996 on Arista Records. The production of the record was preceded by the deaths of many of Smith's close friends and peers, including her husband Fred "Sonic" Smith, her brother Todd, Robert Mapplethorpe, Richard Sohl and Kurt Cobain, with whom Smith had sympathized. In addition to this, Gone Again also features the last studio performance of Jeff Buckley, released before his death less than a year later.

In May of 1999 Rolling Stone magazine placed the album on its list of "The Essential Recordings of the '90s".

Track listing

Samples

Personnel 
Band
 Patti Smith – vocals, guitar
 Lenny Kaye – guitar, production
 Luis Resto – keyboards
 Jay Dee Daugherty – drums
 Tony Shanahan – bass

With
 Oliver Ray – guitar, whistle, photography, feedback
 Tom Verlaine – guitar
Additional personnel
 Angela Skouras – design
 Annie Leibovitz – photography
 Brian Sperber – guitar, engineer
 Cesar Diaz – guitar
 Eileen Ivers – fiddle
 Greg Calbi – mastering
 Hearn Gadbois – percussion
 Jane Scarpantoni – cello
 Jeff Buckley – vocals
 John Angello – mixing
 John Cale – organ
 Kimberly Smith – mandolin
 Malcolm Burn – production, engineering, dulcimer, guitar
 Patrick McCarthy – mixing
 Rick Kiernan – saw
 Roy Cicala – mixing
 Whit Smith – guitar

Charts

Release history

Notes

External links 
 
 Gone Again audio and video at Arista Records

Patti Smith albums
1996 albums
Arista Records albums
Albums produced by Malcolm Burn
Albums recorded at Electric Lady Studios
Albums produced by Lenny Kaye